Timberlane Regional High School is located in Plaistow, New Hampshire, and serves as a regional high school for the towns of Atkinson, Danville, Plaistow, and Sandown, New Hampshire. The school was built in 1966 and is a part of the Timberlane Regional School District. Timberlane Regional High School is a co-educational school for grades 9-12.  The school has won the 1996, 1997 and 2014 Excellence In Education Award.  As of 2005, the school has approximately 1,400 students on roll. The school mascot is the owl.  The school is regionally accredited for its award-winning wrestling team, which holds 28 NH State Wrestling Champions titles, as of 2020.

History 

Timberlane was built in the vicinity of Plaistow's town dump in 1966 as a regional high school for the four towns it still serves today. The name 'Timberlane' came from the forestry industry that played a major role in the economic development of New Hampshire. Before the school was built, students attended several different high schools in the area, including Haverhill High School in nearby Haverhill, Massachusetts.

During the 1970s the school experienced a strike of nearly all its faculty, and overcrowding which necessitated double sessions (one half of the students would take classes in the morning, with the other half taking classes in the afternoon). This overcrowding was rectified in 1975 by the opening of the Timberlane Regional Middle School as a neighbor to the school.

By the early 1980s, the school needed expansion. An addition was completed in 1987, which included a second gymnasium and increased space for the athletic program. The student numbers continued to increase as families moved from Boston, Massachusetts, further out to the suburbs, and by the mid-1990s the school again became overcrowded. In the fall of 1998 several modular classrooms were installed on the property as a temporary solution, and the community demanded an extensive remodelling of the building and the six other schools in the Timberlane Regional School District.

In 1999, a $40 million renovation program was carried out district-wide, which included a complete remodeling and expansion of the high school as well as the construction of the $7 million Timberlane Regional Performing Arts Center.  Several new classrooms were added, the sizes of the cafeteria and gymnasium were increased, and a ventilation system was installed.  During the summer of 2007, a new roof was brought to the school after many years of leaks.

Academics 
In addition to its traditional academic offerings, Timberlane allows students to take vocational classes at Salem High School and Pinkerton Academy.

Advanced Placement offerings 
Timberlane offers the following AP courses:

 AP Calculus (AB)
 AP Statistics
 AP Biology
 AP Physics B
 AP Chemistry
 AP U.S. History
 AP World History
 AP English Literature and Composition
 AP United States Government and Politics
 AP Computer Science
 AP European History
 AP Human Geography
 AP Environmental Science
 AP Art
 AP English Language and Composition
 Practicing Teaching course offered through Southern New Hampshire University

Notable alumni 
Kirk Carlsen (2005), professional cyclist
Lily Hevesh (2016), domino artist and YouTuber

Controversies
In 2009, saw joe student Joshua Stubbs wrote an essay entitled “Sen10rs”, where he rated and reviewed each student of the senior class. This caused a public uproar and was reported and followed by many media outlets.

In 2018, teacher Daniel Joyce was arrested on charges of assaulting a student.

In May 2021 during a meeting at the school, an attending mother by the name of Kate Bossi was arrested for not cooperating with mask mandate rules. 

On December 15th 2021, High school math teacher David Russell turned himself into authorities after a warrant was issued for his arrest for simple and sexual assault of a juvenile high school student. Russell was previously placed on administrative leave in November 2021 pending the outcome of the districts investigation.

See also 

 Atkinson Academy
 Plaistow, New Hampshire
 Timberlane Regional Middle School

References

External links 
 
Timberlane Regional School District
Timberlane PTSA
TRHS Phanfare Profile (Photos)
TRHS Student Artwork
 

Schools in Rockingham County, New Hampshire
Public high schools in New Hampshire
School buildings completed in 1966
Plaistow, New Hampshire